Temple Christian School is a private, Christian secondary school in the ministry of Cornerstone Baptist Temple. The school is located in Dayton, Ohio, and serves approximately 200 students. Temple Christian's mascot is the tiger. Their motto is "A Quality Education in a Christian Environment".

When the school was founded in the 1968, the school's president said that he hoped parents would enroll because public schools taught evolution and had "communistic influences" in social studies texts.

Some historians have argued that Temple Christian was part of the segregation academy movement. In 1972, the churches pastor argued that school integration was immoral since the Bible taught that black and white people should remain separated. When Dayton public schools were desegregated in the late 1970s, the school's enrollment nearly doubled.

Temple Christian School won the National Association of Christian Athletes (NACA) Division II Soccer Championship three years in a row - 1982, 1983 and 1984.

References

External links
 Temple Christian Website

Baptist schools in the United States
Christian schools in Ohio
High schools in Dayton, Ohio
Private high schools in Ohio
Private middle schools in Ohio
Private elementary schools in Ohio
Segregation academies
1967 establishments in Ohio
Educational institutions established in 1967